Pancrazio Buciunì was an Italian model, lover and heir of Wilhelm von Gloeden, a German photographer who settled in Sicily in the late nineteenth century and was significant in the History of Taormina.

Early life 

When Wilhelm von Gloeden arrived in the hilltop city of Taormina overlooking the Ionian Sea, he engaged the services of a local boy, Pancrazio Buciunì, named after Pancras of Taormina. The fourteen year old was already extremely handsome, with dark skin and large eyes. Von Gloeden nicknamed him "Il Moro" (The Moor) because of his dark complexion. Il Moro first became one of von Gloeden's models, then assistant, pupil and eventually lover.

The couple were in love. The young Buciunì looked after von Gloeden when he was sick, administering medications, getting special food from townspeople, preparing the salt water baths that doctors prescribed. He also arranged for local youths to participate in the midnight parties von Gloeden threw for his guests.

First World War 
When Italy entered the First World War, Gloeden had to leave the country. He left his home and studio in the care of Buciunì until his return in 1919. Buciunì was conscripted into the Royal Italian Army when the war began. Since he was in his thirties, he was not sent to the front, but was posted to a coastal artillery unit near Taormina. Thus, he was able to look after the villa and maintain the studio.

Buciunì and von Gloeden were able to communicate with the help of a Swiss friend. Since Italy and Germany were at war, letters could not be sent directly. Wilhelm mailed them to neutral Switzerland. Then letters were resent to Pancrazio. This mail exchange continued for almost the entire war. There was no political or military information in the letters, but when some were opened in a routine check, Italian authorities suspected something. Buciunì wrote to von Gloeden about the house and the animals, with details about the conduct of "the crow" and "the dove". He also wrote about models, referring to them by first names. Some suspected this was part of an espionage network. As a result, Buciunì was arrested on charges of treason. He was imprisoned for three months at a military prison and faced court-martial as a spy with capital punishment if convicted. Despite interrogations, during which he was threatened with shooting, if he did not tell who were the persons with "cover" names, he convinced the military he was loyal. Buciunì was sent back to serve with his artillery unit and was also allowed to resume correspondence with von Gloeden.

After First World War 
Von Gloeden returned to Taormina in 1919, as soon as the war ended. He continued to photograph till 1930 with Pancrazio Buciunì always by his side. When von Gloeden died in 1931, Buciunì was named as his heir. He received all his personal belongings and about 3,000 photographic glass plates. Buciunì was married and had children.

During the Mussolini regime 
At the end of the 1920s, when the Vatican formed an alliance with the fascist government, some 1,000 glass negatives and about 2,000 prints from von Gloeden's inheritance were confiscated and destroyed by police as obscene. The so-called vice campaign started in 1936. The police raided Il Moro's home. Over 1,000 of the master glass negatives were destroyed, while he wept. He was accused of keeping pornography and arrested. Buciunì was charged and put on trial. The same as with his treason case he was able to defend himself and von Gloeden's memory, telling the court that it was not competent to judge works of art. He listed collectors who kept those photographs, including Italian museums and critics, as well as the Ministry of Education itself. The court acquitted him, but this couldn't save the destroyed works. Il Moro distributed the remaining plates among local families, priests and institutions.

After World War II 

When Buciunì reassembled his collection after World War II ended, he found that only one third of the works was saved. Others were destroyed or disappeared. Little is known about Il Moro's life after his trials and World War II. When Roger Peyrefitte visited Taormina in the 1940s, he mentioned Pancrazio Buciunì in his novel, telling that: "His faithful Moro, today a simple fisherman, working at what many of his countrymen do (fishing)".

Pancrazio Buciunì died in 1963. His descendants still live in Taormina and keep part of his collection. Some 800 remnants of von Gloeden's work, that belonged to Il Moro, including 800 glass negatives and 200 albumen prints, were moved to the archive of Lucio Amelio in Naples.

References 

Models from Sicily
People from Taormina
1879 births
1963 deaths
Italian LGBT people